The vertex k-center problem is a classical NP-hard problem in computer science. It has application in facility location and clustering. Basically, the vertex k-center problem models the following real problem: given a city with  facilities, find the best  facilities where to build fire stations. Since firemen must attend any emergency as quickly as possible, the distance from the farthest facility to its nearest fire station has to be as small as possible. In other words, the position of the fire stations must be such that every possible fire is attended as quickly as possible.

Formal definition 
The vertex k-center problem is a classical NP-Hard problem in computer science. It was first proposed by Hakimi in 1964. Formally, the vertex k-center problem consists in: given a complete undirected graph   in a metric space, and a positive integer , find a subset  such that   and the objective function   is minimized.

Approximation algorithms
If , the vertex k-center problem can not be (optimally) solved in polynomial time. However, there are some polynomial time approximation algorithms that get near-optimal solutions. Specifically, 2-approximated solutions. Actually, if  the best possible solution that can be achieved by a polynomial time algorithm is a 2-approximated one. In the context of a minimization problem, such as the vertex k-center problem, a 2-approximated solution is any solution   such that , where   is the size of an optimal solution. An algorithm that guarantees to generate 2-approximated solutions is known as a 2-approximation algorithm. The main 2-approximated algorithms for the vertex k-center problem reported in the literature are the Sh algorithm, the HS algorithm, and the Gon algorithm. Even though these algorithms are the (polynomial) best possible ones, their performance on most benchmark datasets is very deficient. Because of this, many heuristics and metaheuristics have been developed through the time. Contrary to common sense, one of the most practical (polynomial) heuristics for the vertex k-center problem is based on the CDS algorithm, which is a 3-approximation algorithm

The Sh algorithm 
Formally characterized by David Shmoys in 1995, the Sh algorithm takes as input a complete undirected graph , a positive integer , and an assumption   on what the optimal solution size is. The Sh algorithm works as follows: selects the first center   at random. So far, the solution consists of only one vertex, . At this point, . Finally, selects the remaining   centers the same way   was selected.

The HS algorithm 
Proposed by Dorit Hochbaum and David Shmoys in 1985, the HS algorithm takes the Sh algorithm as basis.

The Gon algorithm 
Proposed independently by Teofilo Gonzalez, and by Martin Dyer and Alan Frieze in 1985, the Gon algorithm is basically a more powerful version of the Sh algorithm.

The CDS algorithm 
Proposed by García Díaz et al. in 2017, the CDS algorithm is a 3-approximation algorithm that takes ideas from the Gon algorithm (farthest point heuristic), the HS algorithm (parametric pruning), and the relationship between the vertex k-center problem and the Dominating Set problem. However, by performing a binary search over the ordered set of edge costs, a more efficiente heuristic named CDSh is proposed. Despite the suboptimal performance of the CDS algorithm, and the heuristic performance of CDSh, both present a much better performance than the Sh, HS, and Gon algorithms.

Parameterized approximations 
It can be shown that the k-Center problem is W[2]-hard to approximate within a factor of 2 − ε for any ε > 0, when using k as the parameter. This is also true when parameterizing by the doubling dimension (in fact the dimension of a Manhattan metric), unless P=NP. When considering the combined parameter given by k and the doubling dimension, k-Center is still W[1]-hard but it is possible to obtain a parameterized approximation scheme. This is even possible for the variant with vertex capacities, which bound how many vertices can be assigned to an opened center of the solution.

Experimental comparison 
Some of the most widely used benchmark datasets for the vertex k-center problem are the pmed instances from OR-Lib., and some instances from TSP-Lib. Table 1 shows the mean and standard deviation of the experimental approximation factors of the solutions generated by each algorithm over the 40 pmed instances from OR-Lib

Polynomial heuristics

Greedy pure algorithm 
The greedy pure algorithm (or Gr) follows the core idea of greedy algorithms: to take optimal local decisions. In the case of the vertex k-center problem, the optimal local decision consists in selecting each center in such a way that the size of the solution (covering radius) is minimum at each iteration. In other words, the first center selected is the one that solves the 1-center problem. The second center selected is the one that, along with the previous center, generates a solution with minimum covering radius. The remaining centers are selected the same way. The empirical performance of the Gr algorithm is poor on most benchmark instances.

Scoring algorithm 
The Scoring algorithm (or Scr) was introduced by Jurij Mihelič and Borut Robič in 2005. This algorithm takes advantage of the reduction from the vertex k-center problem to the minimum dominating set problem. The problem is solved by pruning the input graph with every possible value of the optimal solution size and then solving the minimum dominating set problem heuristically. This heuristic follows the lazy principle, which takes every decision as slow as possible (opossed to the greedy strategy). The empirical performance of the Scr algorithm is very good on most benchmark instances. However, its running time rapidly becomes impractical as the input grows. So, it seems to be a good algorithm only for small instances.

References 

NP-hard problems
Graph theory
Combinatorial optimization
Approximation algorithms